Crawford College, Durban was an alternative, independent school in Glenmore in Durban, KwaZulu-Natal, South Africa. The school was established  by Graeme Crawford in 1997 on the campus of Carmel College, a Jewish high school. Sometime after 1997 the school was bought by the ADvTECH Group which closed the school down on 1 December 2006. Eden College Durban opened on the same campus in 2007. Its principal when it closed was Ms. Louise Underhill, and the Deputies were Terry Barnes and Mr. Chris Marcellin.

There are two other Crawford Schools in KwaZulu-Natal: Crawford College, La Lucia and Crawford College, North Coast.

References

External links
Crawford College, Durban official site

1997 establishments in South Africa
Defunct schools in South Africa
Educational institutions established in 1997
Private schools in KwaZulu-Natal